The final of the Men's 200 metres event at the 2003 Pan American Games took place on Friday August 8, 2003, with the heats and the semifinals staged a day earlier.

Medalists

Records

Results

See also
2003 World Championships in Athletics – Men's 200 metres
Athletics at the 2004 Summer Olympics – Men's 200 metres

References
Results

200 metres, Men's
2003